Douane  or Douanes may refer to:

Customs, an authority or agency in a country responsible for collecting tariffs and for controlling the flow of goods into and out of a country
Custom house, traditionally a building housing the offices for above authority or agency
 Directorate-General of Customs and Indirect Taxes, a law enforcement agency in France
Douane, part of the Tax and Customs Administration, a service of the government of the Netherlands
 Douanes, a system of taxation through custom duties in France during the reign of King Louis XIV of France
Douanes (ballet), by Geoffrey Toye
AS Douanes (disambiguation), several sport clubs